Brewster High School may refer to several schools in the United States:

Brewster High School (New York) 
Brewster High School (Washington)
Brewster High School (Kansas), Brewster, Kansas 
Brewster Catholic High School, Tampa, Florida

Brewster High School may also refer to:
Brewster Academy, Wolfeboro, New Hampshire